Kajike Dam  is a gravity dam located in Hiroshima Prefecture in Japan. The dam is used for flood control. The catchment area of the dam is 3.5 km2. The dam impounds about 8  ha of land when full and can store 1060 thousand cubic meters of water. The construction of the dam was started on 1987 and completed in 2008.

References

Dams in Hiroshima Prefecture